Carolina Dieckmann Worcman (born 16 September 1978) is a Brazilian actress. She has acted in telenovelas since 1993. A 2004 article in the Women's Wear Daily described Dieckmann as one of the "fastest-rising actresses" in Brazil.

She portrayed a person with leukemia in the telenovela Laços de Família; in response 23,000 marrow donations were given after the telenovela aired.

Personal life
Dieckmann was born in Rio de Janeiro, Brazil. She is of Portuguese and German descent.

Carolina married  Tiago Worcman on  May 6, 2007, and they moved to Miami, Florida.

Filmography

Television

Film

Trivia 
In 2012, the Brazilian government approved two cybercrime bills at once. One of them was named "Lei Dieckmann", meaning "Dieckmann Law", after the law got major traction from an incident where nude photos of her were exposed earlier that year.

References

External links

1978 births
Living people
Brazilian emigrants to the United States
Actresses from Rio de Janeiro (city)
Brazilian people of German descent
Brazilian telenovela actresses
Brazilian film actresses
21st-century Brazilian actresses